Syamaprasad College, established in 1945, is an undergraduate college in Kolkata, West Bengal, India. It is affiliated with the University of Calcutta.

Campus
The nearly century old main building of the college also hosts two other colleges. The building is home to the Syamaprasad College from 5 pm onwards. Conversely, from 6:10 am to 11:30 am the building hosts the all-girl Jogamaya Devi College and from 10 am to 5 pm, the co-educational Asutosh College. This system is common across Kolkata and some other cities in India.

Departments

Science

Physics
Mathematics
Computer Science
Electronics
Economics
Geography
Computer Application (Major)
Environmental Science

Arts and Commerce

Bengali
English
Sanskrit
Hindi
French
History
Political Science
Philosophy
Education
Accounting and Finance
Marketing

Notable alumni
Ranjit Mallick, actor
Saheb Chatterjee, singer and actor

See also
Asutosh College
Jogamaya Devi College
List of colleges affiliated to the University of Calcutta
Education in India
Education in West Bengal

References

External links
Syamaprasad College

Educational institutions established in 1945
University of Calcutta affiliates
Universities and colleges in Kolkata
1945 establishments in India